Orestis Sousonis (born 24 April 1999) is a Greek professional footballer who plays as a winger for Lamia.

Club career

Panionios
Sousonis joined Panionios on 1 July 2018.

Lamia
On 11 February 2020, Sousonis joined Lamia on a three-year deal.

References

External links
Lamia Official website
Super League Greece Player Profile - Orestis Sousonis

1999 births
Living people
Super League Greece players
Football League (Greece) players
PAS Lamia 1964 players
Association football forwards
Footballers from Athens
Greek footballers